Rama II is a science fiction novel by Gentry Lee and Arthur C. Clarke, first published in 1989.  It recounts humankind's further interaction with the Ramans, first introduced in Rendezvous with Rama.  Written primarily by Lee, Rama II has a distinctly different writing style than the original, with a more character-driven narrative and a closer-to-contemporary mindset, ambience and human relations than the first novel's more futuristic tones.
Rama II is the first novel of the "new" Rama series, as Rendezvous with Rama is not always counted as part of it. The Rama series includes two more sequels: The Garden of Rama and Rama Revealed.

Plot summary

Seventy years after the events of Rendezvous with Rama, a second Raman vessel enters the Solar System. Its arrival is expected, and on Earth the chosen crew of twelve readies for the voyage to unlock more of Rama's mysteries. Interpersonal conflicts among crew members begin prior to the launch date.

After arriving, an accident kills the leader of the group while still outside Rama, and there is debate over who the replacement should be. The tools and vehicles the crew bring to Rama, based on knowledge from the first expedition, make exploring Rama easier.

The novel ends with three of the twelve astronauts abandoned inside Rama as it travels out of the Solar System.

Characters
Crew of the Newton:
Richard Wakefield: British electrical engineer
Francesca Sabatini: Italian journalist
David Brown: American scientific leader
Shigeru Takagishi: Japanese scientist, expert on first Rama craft
Janos Tabori: Russian cosmonaut
Valeriy Borzov: Russian General and Rama II mission commander
Nicole des Jardins: French chief medical and life-sciences officer
Michael O'Toole: American general
Irina Turgenyev: Russian cosmonaut and pilot
Hiro Yamanaka: Japanese cosmonaut and pilot
Reggie Wilson: American videographer working with Sabatini
Otto Heilmann: German admiral

Books in the series
Rendezvous with Rama (1973)
Rama II (1989)
The Garden of Rama (1991)
Rama Revealed  (1993)

Gentry Lee also wrote two further novels set in the same Rama Universe.

Bright Messengers (1996)
Double Full Moon Night (2000)

References

External links 
 

1989 British novels
1989 science fiction novels
British science fiction novels
Collaborative novels
Novels by Arthur C. Clarke
Rama series
Victor Gollancz Ltd books
Sequel novels